Fritz Alphonse Jean (born 1956) is a Haitian economist, politician and writer who served as governor of the Banque de la République d'Haïti from 1998 until 2001. Since 2012, he is the President of the Chamber of Commerce, Industry and Professions of Nord-Est. and is part of the national commemoration committee of the 100th anniversary of the United States occupation of Haiti. Elected by the Montana Consensus as Provisional President of Haiti, January 30th, 2022. Elected by the Louisiana Summit as Provisional President of Haiti, January 16th, 2022, to lead the transitional government.

Early life and education
Fritz Jean was born in Cap-Haïtien. He originates from the nearby commune of Sainte-Suzanne, Nord-Est, where he spent many childhood summers and with which he maintains strong ties. Fritz Jean studied economics and mathematics in the United States, in New York at Fordham University and the New School for Social Research before returning to pursue his professional career in Haiti.

Professional life

Jean spent several years (1987–91) at the Université d'Etat d'Haïti (UEH) in Port-au-Prince as a professor and consultant before moving on to general economic consulting work in the Haitian public and private sectors. In 1996 he was named vice-governor of the Banque de la République d'Haïti, a post he held for two years. In February 1998, under the René Préval government, he was named governor of Haiti's central bank where he remained in office until August 2001.

Later on, between 2005–09 he was dean of the Faculty of Social Sciences, Economics and Political science at the Université Notre Dame d'Haïti. Passionate about the future of the Haitian youth, Jean also served as president of YMCA-Haiti from 2007 until 2010. Jean speaks Haitian Creole, French and English fluently.

Fritz Jean is also a founding member of the Haitian Stock Exchange. On February 25, 2016, he was nominated as the interim Prime Minister of Haiti.

On March 20, 2016, the lower house of the chamber of deputies of Haiti's parliament rejected the general policy of Fritz Jean. He did not receive the confidence vote by the majority of deputies.

The next day, Enex Jean-Charles was chosen to replace Fritz Jean as the new Prime minister of Haiti.

Book Publications

1. "Haiti – the end of an economic history" (original title in French: "Haïti – la fin d'une histoire économique") is an economical and historical overview of Haiti published in 2013, sold and distributed in Haiti

2. "Amethys – open wounds" (original title in French: "Améthys – Plaies Ouvertes") is Jean's first novel, written in French, that follows the adventures of a young boy living in Cap-Haitien.

References

1953 births
21st-century Haitian politicians
Haitian economists
Governors of the Bank of the Republic of Haiti
Living people
Prime Ministers of Haiti
Academic staff of the State University of Haiti
YMCA leaders